Nihad Sadibašić (born 10 December 1975) is a Bosnian retired football player.

Club career
He spent half a season in Austria early in his career and still played for Bosnian third tier-side Vitez in 2016, aged 40.

International career
Sadibašić made 2 senior appearances for Bosnia and Herzegovina (1 unofficial), both of them at the January 2001 Millenium Cup: the match against Bangladesh there marked his international debut and his second and final international was against Chile.

References

External links

Profile - NFSBIH

1975 births
Living people
People from Vitez
Association football midfielders
Bosnia and Herzegovina footballers
Bosnia and Herzegovina international footballers
NK Travnik players
SK Vorwärts Steyr players
FK Velež Mostar players
FK Rudar Kakanj players
NK Zvijezda Gradačac players
FK Krajina Cazin players
NK Vitez players
NK Bratstvo Gračanica players
Premier League of Bosnia and Herzegovina players
2. Liga (Austria) players
First League of the Federation of Bosnia and Herzegovina players
Bosnia and Herzegovina expatriate footballers
Expatriate footballers in Austria
Bosnia and Herzegovina expatriate sportspeople in Austria